Egalitarianism, or equalitarianism, is a school of thought within political philosophy that builds on the concept of social equality, prioritizing it for all people. Egalitarian doctrines are generally characterized by the idea that all humans are equal in fundamental worth or moral status. Egalitarianism is the doctrine that all citizens of a state should be accorded exactly equal rights. Egalitarian doctrines have motivated many modern social movements and ideas, including the Enlightenment, feminism, civil rights, and international human rights.

The term egalitarianism has two distinct definitions in modern English, either as a political doctrine that all people should be treated as equals and have the same political, economic, social and civil rights, or as a social philosophy advocating the removal of economic inequalities among people, economic egalitarianism, or the decentralization of power. Sources define egalitarianism as equality reflecting the natural state of humanity.

Forms 

Some specifically focused egalitarian concerns include communism, legal egalitarianism, luck egalitarianism, political egalitarianism, gender egalitarianism, racial equality, equality of opportunity, and Christian egalitarianism. Common forms of egalitarianism include political and philosophical.

Legal egalitarianism 

One argument is that liberalism provides democratic societies with the means to carry out civic reform by providing a framework for developing public policy and providing the correct conditions for individuals to achieve civil rights.

Equality of person 
The English Bill of Rights of 1689 and the United States Constitution use only the term person in operative language involving fundamental rights and responsibilities, except for a reference to men in the English Bill of Rights regarding men on trial for treason; and a rule of proportional Congressional representation in the 14th Amendment to the United States Constitution.

As the rest of the Constitution, in its operative language the 14th Amendment to the United States Constitution uses the term person, stating that "nor shall any State deprives any person of life, liberty, or property, without due process of law; nor deny any person within its jurisdiction the equal protection of the laws".

Equality of men and women in rights and responsibilities 
An example of this form is the Tunisian Constitution of 2014 which provides that "men and women shall be equal in their rights and duties".

Gender equality 
The motto "Liberté, égalité, fraternité" was used during the French Revolution and is still used as an official motto of the French government. The 1789 Declaration of the Rights of Man and the Citizen French Constitution is framed also with this basis in equal rights of mankind.

The Declaration of Independence of the United States is an example of an assertion of equality of men as "All men are created equal" and the wording of men and man is a reference to both men and women, i.e., mankind. John Locke is sometimes considered the founder of this form.

Many state constitutions in the United States also use the rights of man language rather than rights of person since the noun man has always been a reference to and an inclusion of both men and women.

Feminism is greatly informed by egalitarian philosophy, being a gender-focused philosophy of equality. Feminism is distinguished from egalitarianism by also existing as a political and social movement.

Social egalitarianism 

At a cultural level, egalitarian theories have developed in sophistication and acceptance during the past two hundred years. Among the notable broadly egalitarian philosophies are socialism, communism, social anarchism, libertarian socialism, left-libertarianism, and progressivism, some of which propound economic egalitarianism. Whether any of these ideas have been significantly implemented in practice remains a controversial question. Anti-egalitarianism or elitism is opposition to egalitarianism.

Economic  
A very early example of equality is what might be described as outcome economic egalitarianism is the Chinese philosophy of agriculturalism which held that the economic policies of a country need to be based upon egalitarian self-sufficiency.

In socialism, social ownership of means of production is sometimes considered to be a form of economic egalitarianism because in an economy characterized by social ownership the surplus product generated by industry would accrue to the population as a whole as opposed to a class of private owners, thereby granting each increased autonomy and greater equality in their relationships with one another. Although the economist Karl Marx is sometimes mistaken to be an egalitarian, Marx eschewed normative theorizing on moral principles altogether. Marx did have a theory of the evolution of moral principles concerning specific economic systems.

The American economist John Roemer has put forth a new perspective of equality and its relationship to socialism. Roemer attempts to reformulate Marxist analysis to accommodate normative principles of distributive justice, shifting the argument for socialism away from purely technical and materialist reasons to one of distributive justice. Roemer argues that according to the principle of distributive justice, the traditional definition of socialism is based on the principle that individual compensation is proportional to the value of the labor one expends in production ("To each according to his contribution") is inadequate. Roemer concludes that egalitarians must reject socialism as it is classically defined for equality to be realized.

Egalitarianism and non-human animals 
Many philosophers, including Ingmar Persson, Peter Vallentyne, Nils Holtug, Catia Faria and Lewis Gompertz, have argued that egalitarianism implies that the interests of non-human animals must be taken into account as well. Philosopher Oscar Horta has further argued that "[e]galitarianism implies rejecting speciesism, and in practice, it prescribes ceasing to exploit nonhuman animals" and that we should aid animals suffering in nature. Furthermore, Horta argues that "because [nonhuman animals] are worse off in comparison to humans, egalitarianism prescribes giving priority to the interests of nonhuman animals".

Religious and spiritual egalitarianism

Islam 
The Quran states: "O mankind, indeed We have created you from male and female and made you peoples and tribes that you may know one another. Indeed, the noblest of you in the sight of Allah is the most righteous of you. Indeed, Allah is Knowing and Acquainted". Muhammad echoed these egalitarian sentiments, sentiments that clashed with the practices of the pre-Islamic cultures. In a review of Louise Marlow's Hierarchy and Egalitarianism in Islamic Thought, Ismail Poonawala wrote: "With the establishment of the Arab-Muslim Empire, however, this egalitarian notion, as well as other ideals, such as social justice and social service, that is, alleviating suffering and helping the needy, which constituted an integral part of the Islamic teaching, slowly receded into the background. The explanation given for this change generally reiterates the fact that the main concern of the ruling authorities became the consolidation of their power and the administration of the state rather than upholding and implementing those Islamic ideals nurtured by the Qur'an and the Prophet."

Christianity 
The Bible states: "There is neither Jew nor Greek, slave nor free, male nor female, for you are all one in Christ Jesus." In 1957, Martin Luther King Jr. cited the passage in a pamphlet opposing racial segregation in the United States. He wrote, "Racial segregation is a blatant denial of the unity which we all have in Christ." He also alluded to the verse at the end of his 1963 "I Have a Dream" speech. Considered in its entirety, the verse is cited to support an egalitarian interpretation of Christianity. According to Jakobus M. Vorster, the central question debated by theologians "is whether the statement in Galatians  3:28 about ecclesiastical relationships can be translated into a Christian-ethical norm for all human relationships". Vorster argues that it can, and that the verse provides a Christian foundation for the promotion of human rights and equality, in contrast to "patriarchy, racism and exploitation" which in his opinion are caused by human sinfulness. According to Karin Neutel, "Contemporary interpreters have updated Paul’s statement and added pairs to the three original ones: 'neither gay nor straight,' 'neither healthy nor disabled,' and 'neither black nor white.'... [The original] three pairs must have been as relevant in the first century, as the additional categories are today." She argues that the verse points to a utopian, cosmopolitan community.

Modern egalitarianism theory 
Modern egalitarianism is a theory that rejects the classic definition of egalitarianism as a possible achievement economically, politically, and socially. Modern egalitarianism theory, or new egalitarianism, outlines that if everyone had the same opportunity cost, then there would be no comparative advances and no one would gain from trading with each other. In essence, the immense gains people receive from trading with each other arise because they are unequal in characteristics and talents—these differences may be innate or developed so that people can gain from trading with each other.

Reception  
The cultural theory of risk holds egalitarianism — with fatalism termed as its opposite — as defined by a negative attitude towards rules and principles; and a positive attitude towards group decision-making. The theory distinguishes between hierarchists, who are positive towards both rules and groups; and egalitarians, who are positive towards groups, but negative towards rules.

This is by definition a form of anarchist equality as referred to by Alexander Berkman. Thus, the fabric of an egalitarian society is held together by cooperation and implicit peer pressure rather than by explicit rules and punishment. Thompson et al. theorize that any society consisting of only one perspective, be it egalitarianism, hierarchies, individualist, fatalist or autonomists will be inherently unstable as the claim is that an interplay between all these perspectives are required if each perspective is to be fulfilling. Although an individualist according to cultural theory is aversive towards both principles and groups, individualism is not fulfilling if individual brilliance cannot be recognized by groups, or if individual brilliance cannot be made permanent in the form of principles. Accordingly, egalitarians have no power except through their presence, unless they (by definition, reluctantly) embrace principles which enable them to cooperate with fatalists and hierarchies. They will also have no individual sense of direction in the absence of a group. This could be mitigated by following individuals outside their group, namely autonomists or individualists. Berkman suggests that "equality does not mean an equal amount but equal opportunity. ... Do not make the mistake of identifying equality in liberty with the forced equality of the convict camp. True anarchist equality implies freedom, not quantity. It does not mean that everyone must eat, drink, or wear the same things, do the same work, or live in the same manner. Far from it: the very reverse. ... Individual needs and tastes differ, as appetites differ. It is an equal opportunity to satisfy them that constitutes true equality. ... Far from leveling, such equality opens the door for the greatest possible variety of activity and development. For human character is diverse."

Marxism 
Karl Marx and Friedrich Engels believed that an international proletarian revolution would bring about a socialist society which would then eventually give way to a communist stage of social development which would be a classless, stateless, moneyless, humane society erected on common ownership of the means of production and the principle of "From each according to their ability, to each according to their needs". Marxism rejected egalitarianism in the sense of greater equality between classes, clearly distinguishing it from the socialist notion of the abolition of classes based on the division between workers and owners of productive property. Marx's view of classlessness was not the subordination of society to a universal interest such as a universal notion of equality, but it was about the creation of the conditions that would enable individuals to pursue their true interests and desires, making Marx's notion of communist society radically individualistic.

Marx was a proponent of two principles, with the first ("To each according to his contribution") being applied to socialism and the second ("To each according to their needs") to an advanced communist society. Although his position is often confused or conflated with distributive egalitarianism in which only the goods and services resulting from production are distributed according to notional equality, Marx eschewed the entire concept of equality as abstract and bourgeois, preferring to focus on more concrete principles such as opposition to exploitation on materialist grounds and economic logic.

Criticism

In the title essay of his book Egalitarianism as a Revolt Against Nature and Other Essays, Murray Rothbard argued that egalitarian theory always results in a politics of statist control because it is founded on revolt against the ontological structure of reality itself.

See also 

 "All men are created equal"
 Asset-based egalitarianism
 Citizen's dividend
 Consociationalism
 Deep ecology
 Discrimination
 Economic inequality
 Egalitarian social choice rule
 Equal consideration of interests
 Equal opportunity
 Equality of outcome
 Feminism
 Gift economy
 Inequity aversion
 Left-wing politics
 Legal status of transgender people
 LGBT rights by country or territory
 Men's rights movement
 Meritocracy
 Mutualism
 Natural rights and legal rights
 Prioritarianism
 Reciprocal altruism
 Redistributive justice
 Same-sex marriage
 Social dividend
 Transfeminism
 Universal basic income

References

External links 

 Internet Encyclopedia of Philosophy
 
 
 Stanford Encyclopedia of Philosophy
 
 
 
 
 
 
 

 
Economic ideologies
Equality rights
Consequentialism
Decentralization
Fairness criteria
Human rights
Political culture
Political ideologies
Social inequality
Social justice
Social theories